The Tankas or boat people are a sinicised ethnic group in Southern China who have traditionally lived on junks in coastal parts of Guangdong, Guangxi, Fujian, Hainan, Shanghai, Zhejiang and along the Yangtze river, as well as Hong Kong, and Macau. The boat people are referred to with other different names outside of Guangdong (not called Tanka). Though many now live onshore, some from the older generations still live on their boats and pursue their traditional livelihood of fishing. Historically, the Tankas were considered to be outcasts. Since they were boat people who lived by the sea, they were sometimes referred to as "sea gypsies" by both Chinese and British. Tanka origins can be traced back to the native ethnic minorities of southern China known historically as the Baiyue who may have taken refuge on the sea and gradually assimilated into Han culture. However, Tanka have preserved many of their native traditions that are not found in Han Chinese culture.

A small number of Tankas also live in parts of Vietnam. There they are called Dan and are classified as a subgroup of the Ngái ethnicity.

Etymology and terminology
According to official Liu Zongyuan (Liou Tsung-yüan; ; 773–819) of the Tang Dynasty, there were Tanka people settled in the boats of nowadays Guangdong province and Guangxi Zhang autonomous region.

"Tank" is a Cantonese term for boat or junk and "ka" means family or peoples. The term Tanka is now considered derogatory and no longer in common use. These boat dwellers are now referred to in China as "on-water people", or "people of the southern sea". No standardised English translation of this term exists. "Boat People" is a commonly used translation, although it may be confused with the similar term for Vietnamese refugees in Hong Kong. The term "Boat Dwellers" was proposed by Dr. Lee Ho Yin of The University of Hong Kong in 1999, and it has been adopted by the Hong Kong Museum of History for its exhibition.

Both the Tanka and the Cantonese speak Cantonese. However, Tanka living in Fujian speak Min Chinese.

"Boat people" was a general term for the Tanka. The name Tanka was used only by Cantonese to describe the Tanka of the Pearl River Delta.

The Tanka boat people of the Yangtze region were called the Nine surnames fishermen households, while Tanka families living on land were called the Mean households.

There were two distinct categories of people based on their way of life, and they were further divided into different groups. The Hakka and Cantonese lived on land; the Tanka (including Hokkien-speaking Tanka immigrants often mistaken for being Hoklo) lived on boats and were both classified as boat people.

The differences between the sea dwelling Tanka and land dwellers were not based merely on their way of life. Cantonese and Hakka who lived on land fished sometimes for a living, but these land fishermen never mixed or married with the Tanka fishermen. Tanka were barred from Cantonese and Hakka celebrations.

British reports on Hong Kong described the Tanka including Hoklo-speaking Tanka boat people living in Hong Kong "since time unknown". The encyclopaedia Americana alleged that Tanka lived in Hong Kong "since prehistoric times".

Geographic Distribution
The Tanka people are found throughout the coasts and rivers of the following regions:

Zhejiang: Zhoushan Archipelago, Taizhou Bay, Wenzhou Bay, Sanmen Bay, Hangzhou Bay, Xin'an River, Fuchun River, Lanjiang River
 Fujian: Min River Mouth, Fuqing Bay, Xinghua Bay, Quanzhou Bay, Amoy Bay, Zhangzhou Water Front
 Guangdong: Jieshi Bay, Honghai Bay, Daya Bay, Dapeng Bay, Zhujiang River Mouth, Leizhou Bay, Lingding Sea, Zhanjiang, Wanshan Archipelago
 Guangxi: You River
 Anhui: Xin'an River
 Jiangxi: Gan River
 Hainan: Qiongzhou Strait, Sanya Bay
 Beijing, Jiangsu, Henan, Hubei, Hunan: Grand Canal
 Shanghai: city river
 Hong Kong: Kowloon
 Macau: Macau Bay

Origin

Mythical origins

Some Chinese myths claim that animals were the ancestors of the Barbarians, including the Tanka people. Some ancient Chinese sources claimed that water snakes were the ancestors of the Tanka, saying that they could last for three days in the water, without breathing air.

Baiyue connection and origins in Southern China

The Tanka are considered by some scholars to be related to other minority peoples of southern China, such as the Yao and Li people (Miao). The Amoy University anthropologist Ling Hui-hsiang wrote on his theory of the Fujian Tanka being descendants of the Bai Yue. He claimed that Guangdong and Fujian Tanka are definitely descended from the old Bai Yue peoples, and that they may have been ancestors of the Malay race. The Tanka inherited their lifestyle and culture from the original Yue peoples who inhabited Hong Kong during the Neolithic era. After the First Emperor of China conquered Hong Kong, groups from northern and central China moved into the general area of Guangdong, including Hong Kong.

One theory proposes that the ancient Yue inhabitants of southern China are the ancestors of the modern Tanka boat people. The majority of western academics subscribe to this theory, and use Chinese historical sources. (The ancient Chinese used the term "Yue" to refer to all southern barbarians.) The Oxford English Dictionary, 2nd Edition, states that the ancestors of the Tanka were native people.

The Tanka's ancestors had been pushed to the southern coast by Chinese peasants who took over their land.

During the British colonial era in Hong Kong, the Tanka were considered a separate ethnic group from the Punti, Hakka, and Hoklo. Punti is another name for Cantonese (it means "local"), who came from mainly Guangdong districts. The Hakka and Hoklo are not considered as Puntis.

The Tanka have been compared to the She people by some historians, practising Han Chinese culture, while being an ethnic minority descended from natives of Southern China.

Yao connections

Chinese scholars and gazettes described the Tanka as a "Yao" tribe, with some other sources noting that "Tan" people lived at Lantau, and other sources saying "Yao" people lived there. As a result, they refused to obey the salt monopoly of the Song dynasty (Sung dynasty; 960–1276/1279) government. The county gazetteer of Sun On in 1729 described the Tanka as "Yao barbarians", and the Tanka were viewed as animals.

In modern times, the Tanka claim to be ordinary Chinese who happen to fish for a living, and the local dialect is used as their language.

Historiography
Some southern Chinese historic views of the Tanka were that they were a separate aboriginal ethnic group, "not Han Chinese at all". Chinese Imperial records also claim that the Tanka were descendants of aboriginals. Tanka were also called "sea gypsies".

The Tanka were regarded as Yueh and not Chinese, they were divided into three classifications, "the fish-Tan, the oyster-Tan, and the wood-Tan" in the 12th century, based on what they did for a living.

The three groups of Punti, Hakka, and Hoklo, all of whom spoke different Chinese dialects, despised and fought each other during the late Qing dynasty. However, they were all united in their overwhelming hatred for the Tanka, since the aboriginals of Southern China were the ancestors of the Tanka. The Cantonese Punti had displaced the Tanka aboriginals, after they began conquering southern China.

The Chinese poet Su Dongpo wrote a poem in which mentioned the Tanka.

The Nankai University of Tianjin published the Nankai social and economic quarterly, Volume 9 in 1936, and it referred to the Tanka as aboriginal descendants before Chinese assimilation. The scholar Jacques Gernet also wrote that the Tanka were aboriginals, who were known for being pirates (haidao), which hindered Qing dynasty attempts to assert control in Guangdong.

Scholarly opinions on Baiyue connection
The most widely held theory is that the Tanka are the descendants of the native Yue inhabitants of Guangdong before the Han Cantonese moved in. The theory stated that originally the Yueh peoples inhabited the region, when the Chinese conquest began, either absorbed or expelled the Yue to southern regions. The Tanka, according to this theory, are descended from an outcast Yue tribe who preserved their separate culture.

Regarding the Fujian Minyue Tanka it is suggested that in the southeast coastal regions of China, there were many sea nomads during the Neolithic era and they may have spoken ancestral Austronesian languages, and were skilled seafarers. In fact, there is evidence that an Austronesian language was still spoken in Fujian as late as 620 AD. It is therefore believed that the Tanka were Austronesians who could be more closely related to other Austronesian groups such as native Filipinos, Javanese or Balinese.

A minority of scholars who challenged this theory deny that the Tanka are descended from natives, instead claiming they are basically the same as other Han Cantonese who dwell on land, claiming that neither the land dwelling Han Cantonese nor the water dwelling Tanka have more aboriginal blood than the other, with the Tanka boat people being as Chinese and as Han as ordinary Cantonese.

Eugene Newton Anderson claimed that there was no evidence for any of the conjectures put forward by scholars on the Tanka's origins, citing Chen, who stated that "to what tribe or race they once belonged or were once akin to is still unknown".

Some researchers say the origin of the Tanka is multifaceted, with a portion of them having native Yueh ancestors and others originating from other sources.

Genetics 
Fujian Tanka have customs similar to Daic and Austronesian people. They have a closer genetic affinity with Daic populations than with Han Chinese in paternal lineages, but are closely clustered with southern Han populations (such as Hakka and Teochew) in maternal lineages. It is hypothesized that the Fujian Tanka mainly originate from the ancient indigenous Daic people and have only limited gene flows from Han Chinese populations. 

Another study on the Tanka concluded that the Tanka people not only had a close genetic relationship with both northern Han and ancient Yellow River basin millet farmers but also possessed more southern East Asian ancestry related to Austronesian, Kra-Dai and Hmong-Mien people compared to southern Han. Tanka people had their own unique genetic structure, but kept a close relationship with geographically close southern Han Chinese populations. The results supported that the Tanka people arose from the admixture between southward migration Han Chinese and southern indigenous people.

History

Sinicisation
The Song dynasty engaged in extensive sinicisation of the region with Han people. After many years of sinicisation and assimilation, the Tanka now identify as Han Chinese, though they also have non-Han ancestry from the natives of Southern China. The Cantonese would often buy fish from the Tanka. In some inland regions, the Tanka accounted for half of the total population. The Tanka of Quanzhou were registered as barbarian households.

Ming Dynasty

The Tanka boat population were not registered into the national census as they were of outcast status, with an official imperial edict declaring them untouchable.

Macau and Portuguese rule

The Portuguese, who were granted Macau during the Ming dynasty, often married Tanka women since Han Chinese women would not have relations with them. Some of the Tanka's descendants became Macanese people.

Some Tanka children were enslaved by Portuguese raiders.

The Chinese poet Wu Li wrote a poem, which included a line about the Portuguese in Macau being supplied with fish by the Tanka.

When the Portuguese arrived at Macau, enslaved women from Goa (part of Portuguese India), Siam, Indochina, and Malaya became their wives. Rarely were they Chinese women. The Tanka women were among the only people in China willing to mix and marry with the Portuguese, with other Chinese women refusing to do so.

The majority of marriages between Portuguese and natives was between Portuguese men and women of Tanka origin, who were considered the lowest class of people in China and had relations with Portuguese settlers and sailors, or low class Chinese women. Western men like the Portuguese were refused by high class Chinese women, who did not marry foreigners.

Literature in Macau was written about love affairs and marriage between the Tanka women and Portuguese men, like "A-Chan, A Tancareira", by Henrique de Senna Fernandes.

Qing dynasty
Tanka. Tankia (tan'ka, tan'kyä), n. [Chinese, literally, 'the Tan family or tribe'; < Tan, an aboriginal tribe who formerly occupied the region lying to the south and west of the Meiing (mountains) in southern China, + kia (pronounced ka in Canton), family, people.] The boat population of Canton in southern China, the descendants of an aboriginal tribe named Tan, who were driven by the advance of Chinese civilisation to live in boats upon the river, and who have for centuries been forbidden to live on the land. "Since 1730 they have been permitted to settle in villages in the immediate neighbourhood of the river, but are still excluded from competition for official honours, and are forbidden by custom from intermarrying with the rest of the people. (Q&es, Glossary of Reference.)

Attempts were made to free the Tanka and several other "mean" groups from this status in a series of edicts from 1723 to 1731. They mostly worked as fishermen and tended to gather at some bays. Some built markets or villages on the shore, while others continued to live on their junks or boats. They claimed to be Han Chinese.

The Qing edict said "Cantonese people regard the Dan households as being of the mean class (beijian zhi) and do not allow them to settle on shore. The Dan households, for their part, dare not struggle with the common people", this edict was issued in 1729.

As Hong Kong developed, some of the fishing grounds in Hong Kong became badly polluted or were reclaimed, and so became land. Those Tankas who only own small boats and cannot fish far out to sea are forced to stay inshore in bays, gathering together like floating villages.

Lifestyle and culture
Always there is plenty to see, as the Tanka. the people who live in the boats, are full of life. They are an aboriginal tribe, speaking an altogether different language from the Chinese. On the land they are like fish out of water. They are said never to intermarry with landlubbers, but somehow or other their tongue has crept into many villages in the Chiklung section. The Chinese say the Tanka speech sounds like that of the Americans. It seems to have no tones. A hardy race, the Tanka are untouched by the epidemics that visit our coast, perhaps because they live so much off land. Each family has a boat, its own little kingdom, and, there being plenty of fish, all look better fed than most of our land neighbours. Christianity is, with a few rare exceptions, unknown to them. The only window of our Chiklung house gives the missioner a full view of the village life of some of the boat tribe. The window at present is just the absence of the south wall of the little loft to the shop. Wooden bars can be inserted in holes against robbers.
Catholic Foreign Mission Society of America in 1921

Before leaving the market, by special invitation we had a swim from off one of the sampans (a term used around Canton: here "baby boat" is the name). The water was almost hot and the current surprisingly swift. Nevertheless the Tanka men and boys go in several times a day, and wash jacket and trousers, undressing and dressing in the water. They seem to let the clothes dry on them. Women and girls also jump in daily.
Catholic Foreign Mission Society of America in 1921

Masonry was unknown by the water-dwelling Tanka.

Canton (Guangzhou)
The Tanka also formed a class of prostitutes in Canton, operating the boats in Canton's Pearl River which functioned as brothels. They did not practice foot binding and their dialect was unique. They were forbidden to marry land-dwelling Chinese or live on land. Their ancestors were the natives of Southern China before the Cantonese expelled them to their current home on the water.

Modern China
During the intensive reclamation efforts around the islands of Shanghai in the late 1960s, many Tanka were settled on Hengsha Island and organised as fishing brigades.

British Hong Kong

In 1937, Walter Schofield, then a Cadet Officer in the Hong Kong Civil Service, wrote that at that time the Tankas were "boat-people [who sometimes lived] in boats hauled ashore, or in more or less boat-shaped huts, as at Shau Kei Wan and Tai O". They mainly lived at the harbours at Cheung Chau, Aberdeen, Tai O, Po Toi, Kau Sai Chau and Yau Ma Tei.

Elizabeth Wheeler Andrew (1845–1917) and Katharine Caroline Bushnell (5 February 1856 – January 26, 1946), who wrote extensively on the position of women in the British Empire, wrote about the Tanka inhabitants of Hong Kong and their position in the prostitution industry, catering towards foreign sailors. The Tanka did not marry with the Chinese, being descendants of the natives, they were restricted to the waterways. They supplied their women as prostitutes to British sailors and assisted the British in their military actions around Hong Kong The Tanka in Hong Kong were considered "outcasts" categorised low class.

Ordinary Chinese prostitutes were afraid of serving Westerners since they looked strange to them, while the Tanka prostitutes freely mingled with western men. The Tanka assisted the Europeans with supplies and providing them with prostitutes. Low class European men in Hong Kong easily formed relations with the Tanka prostitutes. The profession of prostitution among the Tanka women led to them being hated by the Chinese both because they had sex with westerners and them being racially Tanka.

The Tanka prostitutes were considered to be "low class", greedy for money, arrogant, and treating clients with a bad attitude. They were known for punching their clients or mocking them by calling them names. Though the Tanka prostitutes were considered low class, their brothels were still remarkably well kept and tidy. A famous fictional story which was written in the 1800s depicted western items decorating the rooms of Tanka prostitutes.

The stereotype among most Chinese in Canton that all Tanka women were prostitutes was common, leading the government during the Republican era to accidentally inflate the number of prostitutes when counting, due to all Tanka women being included. The Tanka women were viewed as such that their prostitution activities were considered part of the normal bustle of a commercial trading city. Sometimes the lowly regarded Tanka prostitutes managed to elevate themselves into higher forms of prostitution.

Tanka women were ostracised from the Cantonese community, and were nicknamed "salt water girls" (ham sui mui in Cantonese) for their services as prostitutes to foreigners in Hong Kong.

Tanka women who worked as prostitutes for foreigners also commonly kept a "nursery" of Tanka girls specifically for exporting them for prostitution work to overseas Chinese communities such as in Australia or America, or to serve as a Chinese or foreigner's concubine.

A report called "Correspondence respecting the alleged existence of Chinese slavery in Hong Kong: presented to both Houses of Parliament by Command of Her Majesty" was presented to the English Parliament in 1882 concerning the existence of slavery in Hong Kong, of which many were Tanka girls serving as prostitutes or mistresses to westerners.

Ernest John Eitel claimed that all "half caste" people in Hong Kong were descended exclusively from Europeans having relationship with Tanka women, and not Chinese women. The theory that most of the Eurasian mixed race Hong Kong people are descended only from Tanka women and European men, and not ordinary Cantonese women, is backed up by other researchers who pointed out that Tanka women freely consorted with foreigners due to the fact that they were not bound by the same Confucian traditions as the Cantonese, and having a relationship with European men was advantageous for Tanka women. The ordinary Cantonese women did not sleep with European men, so the Eurasian population was formed only from Tanka and European admixture.

The day labourers settled down in huts at Taipingshan, at Saiyingpun and at Tsimshatsui. But the largest proportion of the Chinese population were the so-called Tanka or boat people, the pariahs of South-China, whose intimate connection with the social life of the foreign merchants in the Canton factories used to call forth an annual proclamation on the part of the Cantonese Authorities warning foreigners against the demoralising influences of these people. These Tan-ka people, forbidden by Chinese law (since A.D. 1730) to settle on shore or to compete at literary examinations, and prohibited by custom from intermarrying with the rest of the people, were from the earliest days of the East India Company always the trusty allies of foreigners. They furnished pilots and supplies of provisions to British men-of war, troopships and mercantile vessels, at times when doing so was declared by the Chinese Government to be rank treason, unsparingly visited with capital punishment. They were the hangers-on of the foreign factories of Canton and of the British shipping at Lintin, Kamsingmoon, Tungkin and Hongkong Bay. They invaded Hongkong the moment the settlement was started, living at first on boats in the harbour with their numerous families, and gradually settling on shore. They have maintained ever since almost a monopoly of the supply of pilots and ships' crews, of the fish trade and the cattle trade, but unfortunately also of the trade in girls and women. Strange to say, when the settlement was first started, it was estimated that some 2,000 of these Tan-ka people had flocked to Hongkong, but at the present time they are about the same number, a tendency having set in among them to settle on shore rather than on the water and to disavow their Tan-ka extraction to mix on equal terms with the mass of the Chinese community. The half-caste population in Hongkong were, from the earliest days of the settlement of the Colony and down to the present day, almost exclusively the off-spring of these Tan-ka people. But, like the Tan-ka people themselves, they are happily under the influence of a process of continuous re-absorption in the mass of the Chinese residents of the Colony.

During British rule some special schools were created for the Tanka.

In 1962 a typhoon struck boats belonging to the Tanka, likely including Hoklo-speaking Tanka mistaken for being Hoklo, destroying hundreds.

During the 1970s the number of Tanka was reported to be shrinking.

Shanghai
Shanghai, with its many international concessions, contained prostitutes from various areas of China, including Guangdong province. This included the Tanka prostitutes, who were grouped separately from the Cantonese prostitutes. The Cantonese served customers in normal brothels while the Tanka served customers in boats.

Commerce
...always enlivened by the fleet of Tanka boats which pass, conveying passengers to and fro, between the land and the Canton and Hong Kong steamers."
Japan and the Japanese: a narrative of the US government expedition to Japan under Commodore Perry in 1859

Our next picture shows a Chinese tanka boat. The tanka boats are counted by thousands in the rivers and bays of China. They are often employed by our national vessels as conveyances to and. from the shore, thereby saving the health of the sailors, who would be otherwise subjected to pulling long distances under a hot sun, with a liability of contracting some fatal disease peculiar to China, and thus introducing infection in a crowded crew.
Ballou's monthly magazine, Volume 8 in 1858

"Macao.

"We arrived here on the twenty-second, and dispatched a boat to the shore immediately for letters. I received three or four of those fine large letters which are the envy of all who see them, and which are readily distinguishable by their size, and the beautiful style in which they are directed. You cannot imagine the delight with which I devoured their costents. I am glad you wrote so much of our dear pet. 0, my Dita, the longing I feel to take the dear little thing to my heart is agonising! Yesterday I was on shore, and saw a beautiful child of about the same age as ours. I was almost crazy at the sight. Twenty months old! How she must prattle by this time! I fancy I can see her trotting about, following you around the house. What a recompense for the hardest toil of the day would it not be to me, could I only lie down on the floor and have a good romp with her at night!

"And now for Macao, and what I saw, felt, and did. You probably know that a very numerous Chinese population lives entirely in boots; some of them so small that one pities the poor unfortunates who live so miserably. They are born, grow up, marry, and raise children in these boats. You would be astonished to see mothers, with infants at the breast, managing the sails, oars, and rudder of the boat as expertly as any sailor. The Tanka is of very light draft, and, being able to go close in shore, is used to land passengers from the larger boats. As we neared the shore, we noticed small boats pulling toward us from all directions. Soon a boat, "manned" by two really pretty young girls pulling oars, and a third sculling, came alongside, calling out earnestly, 'Takee me boat!' 'Takee me boat!' They had beautiful teeth, white as ivory, brilliant eyes, and their pretty faces, so earnest and pleading, were wreathed in smiles as we gave them the preference over others that joined us from all quarters, clinging to the sides of our large boat, and impeding our headway. The boatmen tried in vain to drive them off. One brute of a fellow splashed repeatedly a poor girl, who. though not at all pretty, had such a depth of meaning and such a sad expression in her eyes and face as charmed me completely. It would have interested any one to hear her scold back, and to see the flashing of her eyes, and the vivid expression in every feature. When I frowned at our sailor, the sudden change in her face from anger to smiles, the earnest 'takee me boat,' as she caught evidence of sympathy from me, was beautiful. We were assailed with these cries from so many, and there was such a clamour, that, in self-defense, we had to choose a boat and go. The first-mentioned girls, on account of their beauty, won the majority, and their boat was clean and well furnished, which is more than could be said of many of them. I caught the look of disappointment which passed over the features of the girl I have described, and it haunts me even now. Trifling as it, appeared to us, such scenes constitute the great events in their poor lives, and such triumphs or defeats are all-important to them.

"Upon entering the Tanka boat, we found the mother of the young girls, and a young infant dressed heroically. The infant was the child of the prettiest one of the girls, whose husband was away fishing. The old woman was quite talkative, and undoubtedly gave us lots of news!

"They had a miniature temple on the bows of the boat, with Joss seated cross-legged, looking very fat, and very red, and very stupid. Before him was an offering of two apricots, but Joss never deigned to look at it, and apparently had no appetite. I felt a sincere respect, however, for the devotional feeling of these poor idolaters, recognising even there the universal instinct which teaches that there is a God.

"I called upon the commodore, who received me with great courtesy, and gave me a very interesting account of the voyage out, by the way of Mauritius, of the Susquehanna, to which I was first appointed. She has gone on to Amoy.

"I made the acquaintance of a Portuguese family, named Lurero. The young ladies are quite accomplished, speaking French, Spanish, and Italian, but no English. They came down to receive the visit of our consul and lady, who called while I was there. Mr. Lurero gave me some specimens of a soap-fruit, and showed me the tree. The fruit is an exceedingly fine soap, which, without any preparation, is used for washing the finest goods.

"We expect to hear of the sailing of the 'Japan Expedition' by the next mail. When Commodore Perry arrives, we shall be kept so busy that time will fly rapidly, and we shall soon be looking forward to our return home, unless Japan disturbances (which are not seriously anticipated) delay us.

"I did not tell you of my visit to 'Camoens' Cave,' the principal attraction of Macao. This 'cave' was the resort of the distinguished Portuguese poet Camoens, who there wrote the greater part of the ' Lusiad.' The cave is situated in the midst of the finest wooded walks I ever saw. The grounds are planted beautifully, and immense vases of flowers stand around. The grounds are not level, but lie up the side of a slope or hill, irregular in shape, and precipitous on one side. There are several fine views, particularly that of the harbor and surrounding islands."

I will here reproduce the following additional items regarding Camoens, from the pen of Walter A. Hose: —

"Macao had a particular interest for me as the first foothold that modern civilisation obtained upon the ancient shores of 'far Cathay,' and as the birthplace of one of the finest epic poems ever written. ... On one of those calm and beautiful nights peculiar to sub-tropical climes, I stood alone upon the white sea-wall, and no sound fell upon my ears save the whirring monotone of insects in the trees above the hills, the periodical chime of bells from anchored ships, and the low, sweet cadence of the incoming tide. I thought it must have been such a night as this that inspired Camoens when he wrote,
Life of Capt. Joseph Fry, the Cuban martyr: Being a faithful record of his remarkable career from childhood to the time of his heroic death at the hands of Spanish executioners; recounting his experience as an officer in the US and Confederate navies, and revealing much of the inner history ... in 1875

Surnames
The Fuzhou Tanka have different surnames than the Tanka of Guangdong. Qing records indicate that "Weng, Ou, Chi, Pu, Jiang, and Hai" (翁, 歐, 池, 浦, 江, 海) were surnames of the Fuzhou Tanka. Qing records also stated that Tanka surnames in Guangdong consisted of "Mai, Pu, Wu, Su, and He" (麥, 濮, 吴, 蘇, 何), alternatively some people claimed Gu and Zeng as Tanka surnames.

Dialect
The Tanka dialect of Yue Chinese is similar in phonology with Cantonese, with the following differences:
 eu /œ/ is pronounced as o /ɔ/ (e.g. "Hong Kong")
 /y/ is pronounced as /u/ or /i/
 /kʷ/ is pronounced as /k/
 no final -m or -p, so they are replaced by -ng /-ŋ/ or -t /-t/
 /n/ is pronounced as /l/, like in some informal varieties of Cantonese
 they also have the tone 2 diminutive change

DNA tests and disease
Tests on the DNA of the Tanka people found that the disease Thalassemia was common among the Tanka. Tests also stated that the ancestors of the Tanka were not Han Chinese, but were native people.

The Tanka suffer from lung cancer more than the Cantonese and Teochew. The frequency of the disease is higher among Tanka. The rate among the Teochew is lower than that of the Cantonese.

Famous Tankas
Sinn Sing Hoi
Henry Fok, Hong Kong billionaire businessman and politician
Timothy Fok

See also
 Pang uk
 Fuzhou Tanka
 Aberdeen floating village in Hong Kong
 Yau Ma Tei Boat People in Hong Kong

References

Bibliography

External links 
 

 
Fujian
Guangdong
Guangxi
Hainan
Hong Kong society
Macau society
Ethnic groups in Macau
Ethnic groups in Vietnam
Ethnic groups in China
Asian diaspora in Hong Kong
Subgroups of the Han Chinese